Trequille Flowers (born June 2, 1995) is an American football cornerback for the Cincinnati Bengals of the National Football League (NFL). He played college football at Oklahoma State. As a senior, Flowers was a first-team All-Big 12 selection and led the team with 79 tackles, two interceptions, and eight pass breakups. Flowers was drafted by the Seattle Seahawks in the fifth round of the 2018 NFL Draft.

Professional career

Seattle Seahawks
The Seattle Seahawks selected Flowers in the fifth round (146th overall) of the 2018 NFL Draft. Flowers was the 13th safety and the 30th defensive back drafted in 2018. The Seahawks previously acquired the pick used to select Flowers as part of a trade that sent Marshawn Lynch to the Oakland Raiders. The Seattle Seahawks immediately announced their decision to convert Flowers from safety to cornerback.

On May 17, 2018, the Seattle Seahawks signed Flowers to a four-year, $2.75 million contract that includes a signing bonus of $298,729.

Flowers entered training camp as a backup cornerback, but began competing for a job as the starting cornerback after he quickly transitioned to the position and impressed the coaching staff. He competed for the starting cornerback job against veterans Byron Maxwell and Dontae Johnson. Head coach Pete Carroll named Flowers a starting cornerback after injuries to both Maxwell and Johnson. He was named a starter alongside Shaquill Griffin and safeties Bradley McDougald and Earl Thomas.

He made his professional regular season debut and first career start in the Seattle Seahawks' season opener at the Denver Broncos, and recorded eight combined tackles and a pass deflection in their 27-24 loss. Flowers primarily covered Pro Bowl wide receiver Emmanuel Sanders during the game and allowed 10 receptions on 11 targets for 135 yards and a 43-yard touchdown. Flowers was inactive for the Seahawks' Week 2 loss at the Chicago Bears due to a hamstring injury.

Flowers entered the 2020 season third on the depth chart behind Shaquill Griffin and Quinton Dunbar. He played in 11 games with seven starts before being placed on injured reserve on December 5, 2020. On January 2, 2021, Flowers was activated off of injured reserve.

On October 12, 2021, Flowers was waived by the Seahawks.

Cincinnati Bengals
Flowers was claimed off waivers by the Cincinnati Bengals on October 14, 2021. On April 9, 2022, Flowers re-signed with the Bengals.

Personal life
Flowers is the cousin of former NFL fullback Dimitri Flowers.

References

External links
  Seattle Seahawks bio
 Oklahoma State bio

1995 births
Living people
American football cornerbacks
People from Bexar County, Texas
Players of American football from Texas
American football safeties
Oklahoma State Cowboys football players
Seattle Seahawks players
Cincinnati Bengals players
Judson High School alumni